Rodrigo Martín Mannara (born December 24, 1979, in Buenos Aires) is an Argentine football forward who plays for Deportivo Roca.

Mannara's former clubs include Club Atlético Lanús, Arsenal de Sarandí and Racing Club in Argentina. He also played professionally for the Chilean senior clubs Cobreloa and Puerto Montt.

Honours

Club
Universidad Católica
 Primera División de Chile (1): 2010

External links
 Rodrigo Mannara at ESPN Deportes 
  
 Rodrigo Mannara at BDFA 
 
 

1979 births
Living people
Footballers from Buenos Aires
Argentine footballers
Association football forwards
Club Atlético Lanús footballers
Arsenal de Sarandí footballers
Racing Club de Avellaneda footballers
Cobreloa footballers
Puerto Montt footballers
Club Deportivo Universidad Católica footballers
Unión de Santa Fe footballers
Argentine Primera División players
Expatriate footballers in Chile
Argentine expatriate footballers